Mena Mansour Massoud (born September 17, 1991) is an Egyptian Canadian actor known for starring as the title character in the Disney fantasy film Aladdin (2019). He also starred as Jared Malik in the Canadian drama series Open Heart (2015), Tarek Kassar in the Amazon Prime series Tom Clancy's Jack Ryan (2018), Ethan Hart in the Hulu series Reprisal (2019), and Prince Thomas in the Netflix original film The Royal Treatment (2022).

Early life 
Mena Mansour Massoud was born on September 17, 1991 in Cairo to Egyptian Coptic Orthodox Christian parents Gorgit and Mansour Massoud. He has two elder sisters, Marian and Margaret both work in the medical field . He and his family emigrated to Canada when he was three years old. When asked why his family left Egypt, Massoud stated, "I was born there. We immigrated when I was 3 1/2 years old, to Toronto. But I'm still very, very close to my culture and – back home in Egypt.
We're Coptic Christian and my parents just felt like things were getting a little too dangerous when I was growing up in Egypt. They wanted to create a better life for their family so they decided to emigrate to Canada." Massoud grew up in Markham, Ontario, where he attended St. Brother André Catholic High School, where he was the head of the improv team. He later attended the University of Toronto with a major in neuroscience, in the pursuit of becoming a doctor or psychologist. He did not finish this degree, and instead auditioned for theatre schools. Massoud eventually transferred to Ryerson University for their theatre performance program, which he graduated from in 2014.

Career 
Massoud began acting in 2011, with guest appearances on the television series Nikita and Combat Hospital. His role in Nikita, being his first ever on-screen role, was of a terrorist. In an interview with The Daily Beast, it was stated that this role made him set a goal for himself to "find characters who aren’t terrorists or bring negative connotations because of the color of their skin or ethnicity."

In 2015, he was cast as Jared Malik in the Canadian-drama series Open Heart, which was cancelled after one season. In 2017, he starred as Ollie Santos in the film Ordinary Days. In 2018, he had a recurring role as Tarek Kassar in the Amazon Prime original series Jack Ryan.

In 2019, Massoud portrayed the titular character in Disney's fantasy-adventure film Aladdin, which is a live-action adaption of the animated film of the same name. For his performance, he received a Teen Choice Award nomination, and two National Film & TV Award nominations. The December after the movie's release, and five months after the film passed $1 billion in the global box office, Massoud openly spoke about how the film's success has translated into his career. He stated, "I haven’t had a single audition since Aladdin came out," and explained that his career has not seen much growth despite the film.

In the same year, he was cast in the main role of Ethan Hart in the Hulu original series Reprisal. Also in 2019, he appeared as Chaz in the thriller film Strange but True, and starred as Kamal in the drama film Run This Town.

In January 2021, it was announced that Massoud would star as the leading role in his first Egyptian film, Fe Ez El-Dohr. He is also slated to reprise his role of Aladdin in an upcoming sequel.

In January 2022, Massoud portrayed the male lead in Netflix's feature film, The Royal Treatment alongside Laura Marano. His role in the film was the first movie he has starred in since Aladdin.

The following May, Massoud was announced to play a role in the upcoming horror film The Sacrifice Game, as well as serve as an executive producer for the film. That same month, he announced via Instagram that he is producing the film The Last King, an Iranian adaptation of Stephen King. Massoud will portray British-Yemeni boxer Naseem Hamed in the upcoming biographical sports drama Giant opposite Paddy Considine as Brendan Ingle.

Other work 
In September 2019, he was appointed an ambassador by Egypt's Ministry of Migration for their new "Speak Egyptian" initiative, with the goal of preserving the Egyptian identity of those living abroad.

Later that year, he launched the not-for-profit Ethnically Diverse Artists Foundation to help Canadian artists from underrepresented groups jumpstart their careers through securing mentors, training, headshots and includes support for actors, musicians, and visual artists. Speaking about his motivation for the EDA Foundation, Massoud stated, "In the industry, artists of color struggle the most. Caucasian artists have really solidified themselves in the industry, and with African Americans now we see directors and producers who vow to only produce work that shines a light on African American artists. But everybody in the middle gets lost." He spoke again about the foundation and his advocacy for diversity in the industry when he was honored at Egypt's third El Gouna Film Festival in 2019.

In February 2022, Massoud announced the release of his new gin, Dharma Indian Dry Gin, via an Instagram post. He created the gin alongside Emily Shah and Prashant Shah, describing it as "the world’s first & only spirit inspired by Ayurvedic practice" and "an expression of culture, willpower, and history."

Artistry 
Massoud is an admirer of Egyptian comedy movies, in an interview with the BBC, he stated how his Egyptian heritage has inspired him as a comedian, stating: "I grew up watching Egyptian comedy films by the great Egyptian comedians such as Ismail Yassine and Adel Emam. The way they entertain the audience with not only their words but with their body language and facial expressions is totally different from that of the actors here. I played a lot of comedy roles in American productions. My role in Aladdin is also a comedy role. I believe I play comedy roles with a different taste that I learned from our own Egyptian cinema and this makes it appealing in a different way."

Massoud also takes great inspiration from Robin Williams. In an interview with The Hudsucker, he stated that Robin Williams was the actor the impacted him the most, saying "He was an incredibly well-rounded actor but I grew up on his role in Mrs. Doubtfire. That role by itself is very well-rounded and he goes through an amazing journey in that movie. I think it’s very underrated."

Personal life 
Massoud is a vegan and the founder of the book and community with the name 'Evolving Vegan'.

Filmography

Awards and nominations

References

External links 

 
 

1991 births
21st-century Canadian male actors
Canadian Christians
Canadian male film actors
Canadian male television actors
Canadian male voice actors
Canadian people of Coptic descent
Canadian people of Egyptian descent
Toronto Metropolitan University alumni
Egyptian emigrants to Canada
Living people
Male actors from Ontario
People from Markham, Ontario
Egyptian male voice actors
Egyptian male television actors
Male actors from Cairo